Sahai is a surname. Notable people with the surname include:
Krishna Ballabh Sahay Chief Minister of Erstwhile Bihar
Alankrita Sahai (born 1994), Indian model
Amit Sahai (born 1974), American computer scientist
Ganga Sahai, British Indian 19th-century Sanskrit scholar
Raghunath Sahai Puri, Indian politician
Ram Sahai (1895-?), Indian politician
Sachchidanand Sahai (born 1941), Indian epigraphist
Sanjiv N. Sahai (born 1961), Indian businessman
Shashi Bhushan Sahai, Indian writer and police officer
Sheetla Sahai (1932-2011), Indian politician
Suman Sahai, Indian activist
Vivek Sahai, Indian transportation and management expert